Abraham Lure is a fictional character and the protagonist of the Oddworld video game series, created by Oddworld Inhabitants. Abe was introduced in the 1997 game Abe's Oddysee and his character has changed and developed throughout the subsequent games, Abe's Exoddus and Munch's Oddysee.

Abe, a creature known as a Mudokon, initially works as a slave for the meat-processing plant RuptureFarms until his eventual escape. An atypical video game character, he usually does not fight directly and rarely uses any weapons, instead employing stealth and various psychic powers in addition to using the environment against his enemies.

The character was well received by critics. Along with Spyro the Dragon and Crash Bandicoot, Abe was one of the unofficial mascots of the PlayStation and was an example of the PlayStation's more mature style of platformers.

Character conception and development

Abe is the most strongly developed central character of the Oddworld series. He was inspired by the diamond miners of South Africa, who along with other indigenous peoples have suffered the ruthless harvesting of their land and people by industrial profiteers. He evolves and develops throughout the first game, Abe's Oddysee. He is initially a slave along with his fellow Mudokons, but escapes. The game's narrative and its main character deal with ethical and moral issues. Lorne Lanning, Oddworlds creator, has stated that its "characters are driven in a way that is fired by larger issues." Abe was the first protagonist that Oddworld Inhabitants developed. Lanning stated that Abe was named after Abraham of the Old Testament, because of the similarities between Abe trying to discover himself and for what he believes was the difficulty in trying to determine the true source of Abraham's discovery of monotheism:

Originally, the game's developers envisioned Abe and a mule-like creature called "Elum" beginning the game together, living off the land and being thrust into an industrialized factory slave environment. The developers came to the conclusion that the story was stronger should Abe come from a factory existence and later reveal one of self-sustenance, and as such the concept was eventually changed. In this game, Abe tells his story in flashback, which helps the player identify with him as the protagonist. Abe's abilities include chanting, which permits him to take over the mind of some of his enemies. He can also jump, climb, run, and sneak in shadows.

Abe's appearance, resembling that of a grey alien, includes large bulbous eyes, large forehead, a skinny frame, and a bald head with a tuft of feathers. His depiction is humorous. Despite his unusual appearance, which is unlike the "typically cute" platform characters, Abe appeals to a wide range of video game players. His design was meant to look downtrodden, but optimistic. Unlike other Mudokons, Abe has blue or purplish-green skin, bloodshot eyes, and a high ponytail of feathers. The stitches on his lips were given to him because he cried excessively after birth and they were a measure to keep him quiet, though he keeps them now because they were given to him at such a young age before he was "awake enough, conscious enough as a person to really understand why he had these, but it's something that he feels is a part of him, so he doesn't want to snip loose". His skin has three mystical tattoos that grow over his body gradually: one on the back of each hand and one on his chest. Mudokon spirits have given him invisibility for short periods; he is sometimes able to incarnate the Mudokon god Shrykull; and background Mudokons assist him with other powers.

Abe, like all Mudokons, is slow-witted, lazy, and optimistic. He also lacks imagination, logic, intelligence and confidence. But he has a powerful sense of morality, and is usually moved by threats of his own peril, or knowledge of another's. His manner of operation is to infiltrate and sabotage his enemies' businesses, wherein consists most of the gameplay. In the background story, Abe becomes the leader of the "Free Mudokon Party" (also known as "The Marching Mudokons"), the Mudokons’ uprising against their captors, the Magog Cartel. He generally operates alone but is occasionally aided by friends.

Appearances

In video games
At the beginning of Abe's Oddysee, Abe is a happy, ignorant worker at RuptureFarms, a meat-packing plant. Working late at RuptureFarms, he passes an advertisement billboard for the upcoming latest product, and eavesdrops on the factory's annual board meeting. Because wildlife has become more and more scarce, Abe's bosses Molluck and his fellow Glukkons, decide to use the factory's Mudokon slave population as a source of saleable meat: "Mudokon Pops!" After this epiphany (reminiscent of the end of the film Soylent Green), Abe panics and escapes from his workplace. At the end of the game's introductory sequence- a retrospective voiced by Abe- Abe runs for his life. Outside the factory, Abe falls from a cliff, and the Mudokons’ spiritual leader, Big Face, informs him that the animals slaughtered and processed to manufacture 'Tasty Treats', were formerly held sacred by the Mudokuns, and that Abe must relight holy flames extinguished by the Glukkons, in the abandoned temples containing these species. Abe does this with the aid of his steed 'Elum', and is thereafter empowered by Big Face to destroy the Glukkons and their technology. This done, Abe infiltrates RuptureFarms, frees the remaining slaves, and destroys the board of executives; but is himself captured by Molluck's security guards. If a sufficient number of Mudokuns have been rescued in gameplay, the free Modokuns electrocute Molluck, and Big Face presents Abe to a jubilant crowd; if not, the free Modokuns abandon Abe, and Molluck's servitor drops him into a shredding-machine.

Abe's Oddysee was very popular, and the bonus game Oddworld: Abe's Exoddus was released the following year. Abe's Exoddus begins where Abe's Oddysee ends. Abe's abilities in this game were similar to his abilities in the first game, with an expanded ability to communicate with other characters in the world using GameSpeak. In this game, ghostly Mudokons inform Abe that the cemetery 'Necrum' is being excavated by Glukkons, using blind Mudokons as slaves. Abe therefore seeks a cure to the sickness caused by the SoulStorm brew created from the excavated bones, and then journeys to SoulStorm Brewery, which he destroys. He is named a wanted terrorist by the Glukkons, but is revered as a hero by his own people.

Abe and a new character named Munch are playable in Oddworld: Munch's Oddysee. Not long after the events of Abe's Exoddus, Abe helps Munch (the last living remnant of an amphibious race called the Gabbits) to save the last eggs of Munch's species from being eaten by the Glukkons.

In other media
A short film based on the Abe's Exoddus storyline was submitted for Academy Awards consideration after a short cinema run in Los Angeles, but was not nominated. Abe featured in a music video for "Get Freaky", a song by German dance band Music Instructor, and in a music video for the song "Use Your Imagination" in 2002. In 2012, Oddworld Inhabitants expressed interest in having Abe be part of the cast of PlayStation All-Stars Battle Royale for PS3 either as part of the main roster or as a downloadable character.

Reception
The character was well received. In 1998, he was voted at GameSpot as the 10th best video game hero for his "klutzy, benign charm" among other things. In 2008, he ranked fourth on GameDaily's list of top ten ugliest game characters for his hair, expression, and nose piercing. In 2009, Abe qualified as one of 64 contestants for GameSpot's poll for the title of All Time Greatest Video Game Hero, but lost in the first round of eliminations against Ryu of Street Fighter. In 2011, he was also ranked as sixth in a list of ten "really ugly good guys" by Complex. GamesRadar+ included Abe in several published character lists, including their 2018 list of the best heroic characters in video games where he is ranked 27th place. In a 2021 list published by PC Gamer staff, Abe is ranked among the most iconic characters in PC gaming.

References

Action-adventure game characters
Extraterrestrial characters in video games
Video game characters who can teleport
Video game characters with electric or magnetic abilities
Fictional genocide survivors
Fictional hypnotists and indoctrinators
Fictional indigenous peoples
Fictional pacifists
Male characters in video games
Oddworld
Science fiction video game characters
Shapeshifter characters in video games
Fictional slaves in video games
Telepath characters in video games
Video game mascots
Video game characters introduced in 1997
Video game protagonists